Garbahare (also: Garbaharey) (Maay: Garbiharey) is the capital of Gedo, an administrative region in southern Somalia. It is the third largest and most populous city in Gedo region after Bardera and  Luuq.

History
During the Middle Ages, Garbahare and its surrounding area was part of the Ajuran Empire that governed much of southern Somalia and eastern Ethiopia, with its domain extending from Hobyo in the north, to Qelafo in the west, to Kismayo in the south.

In the early modern period, the Garbahare area was ruled by the Geledi Sultanate. The kingdom was eventually incorporated into Italian Somaliland protectorate in 1910 after the death of its last Sultan Osman Ahmed in 1910. After independence in 1960, the city became the capital of Gedo region.

Insecurity of the 1990s
During much of the 1990s, the city of Garbahare was the seat of the Somali National Front militia in the early days of the civil war. Facing pressure from the local population, the militia left.

By early 2001, Garbahare came under the control of the Transitional National Government. All activities shifted to Luuq and Beled Haawo, and Garbahare had a new role to in the region. Neighboring regions such as NFD welcomed the new leadership, as a safer Gedo is also good for the neighboring regions in Kenya and Ethiopia.

See also 
Amiir Nuur Secondary

Notes 

Populated places in Gedo